Adam Cruz is an American jazz drummer from New York City.

Biography
He is best known for his work with pianist Danilo Perez, saxophonist Steve Wilson, David Sanchez, and pianist Edward Simon. He has also toured and recorded with the Mingus Big Band, saxophonist Chris Potter, guitarist Charlie Hunter, and Chick Corea's Origin.

Cruz's debut album as a leader was released in 2011 on Sunnyside Records.  Milestone was given favorable reviews by the Los Angeles Times, Downbeat Magazine, and JazzTimes. The New York Times describes the album as "Informed by several strains of Latin music but just as meaningfully by brisk post-bop and lyrically minded free jazz".

Discography

As leader
 Milestone (Sunnyside, 2011)

As sideman
With Tom Harrell
 The Art of Rhythm (RCA Victor, 1998)
 Paradise (BMG/Bluebird 2001)
 Trip (HighNote, 2014)
 Moving Picture (HighNote, 2017)
 Infinity (HighNote, 2019)

With Mingus Big Band
 Gunslinging Birds (Dreyfus, 1995)
 Live in Time (Dreyfus, 1996)
 Que Viva Mingus! (Dreyfus, 1997)

With Leon Parker
 Above & Below (Epicure, 1994)
 Belief (Columbia, 1996)
 Awakening (Columbia, 1998)

With David Sanchez
 Sketches of Dreams (Columbia, 1995)
 Obsesion (Columbia, 1998)
 Melaza (Columbia, 2000)
 Coral (Columbia, 2004)
 Cultural Survival (Concord Picante, 2008)

With Edward Simon 
 Edward Simon (Kokopelli, 1995)
 Simplicitas (Criss Cross, 2005)
 La Bikina (Red, 2011)
 Venezuelan Suite (Sunnyside, 2013)
 Latin American Songbook (Sunnyside, 2016)

With others
 Ester Andujar, Celebrating Cole Porter (Omix, 2005)
 Patricia Barber, Nightclub (Premonition, 2000)
 Ray Barretto, Standards Rican-ditioned (Zoho, 2006)
 Bruce Barth, Hope Springs Eternal (Double-Time, 1998)
 Bruce Barth, Where Eagles Fly (Fresh Sound, 2000)
 David Binney, Afinidad (Red, 2001)
 Anthony Branker, Dance Music (Origin, 2010)
 Francesco Cafiso, Angelica (CAM Jazz, 2009)
 Joey Calderazzo, Going Home (Sunnyside, 2015)
 Chick Corea, Live at the Blue Note (Stretch, 1998)
 Ronnie Cuber, In a New York Minute (SteepleChase, 1996)
 Paquito D'Rivera, A Night in Englewood (Messidor, 1994)
 Jon Gordon, Currents (Double-Time, 1998)
 Conrad Herwig, The Latin Side of John Coltrane (Astor Place, 1996)
 Klaus Ignatzek, Return Voyage (Candid, 1994)
 Brian Lynch, Spheres of Influence (Sharp Nine, 1997)
 Herbie Mann, America/Brasil (Lightyear, 1997)
 Herbie Mann, 65th Birthday Celebration (Lightyear, 1997)
 Armando Manzanero, El Piano (BMG/RCA, 1995)
 Virginia Mayhew, Nini Green (Chiaroscuro, 1997)
 Donny McCaslin, The Way Through (Arabesque, 2003)
 Sam Newsome, Global Unity (Palmetto, 2001)
 Bill O'Connell, Zocalo (Savant, 2013)
 Eddie Palmieri, Arete (TropiJazz, 1995)
 Eddie Palmieri, Vortex (TropiJazz, 1996)
 Danilo Perez, Till Then (Verve, 2003)
 Dave Pietro, The Chakra Suite (Challenge, 2008)
 Chris Potter, Song for Anyone (Sunnyside, 2007)
 Bruno Raberg, Tailwind (Red Piano, 2018)
 David Virelles, Gnosis (ECM, 2017)
 Steve Wilson, Passages (Stretch, 2000)
 Steve Wilson, Soulful Song (MAXJAZZ, 2003)

References

External links
Official site
 DrummerwWorld
All About Jazz

Living people
Year of birth missing (living people)
20th-century American drummers
20th-century American male musicians
21st-century American drummers
21st-century American male musicians
American jazz drummers
American male drummers
American male jazz musicians
Mingus Big Band members
Sunnyside Records artists